In geometry, a snub cubic prism or snub cuboctahedral prism is a convex uniform polychoron (four-dimensional polytope).

It is one of 18 convex uniform polyhedral prisms created by using uniform prisms to connect pairs of Platonic solids or Archimedean solids in parallel hyperplanes.

See also 
Snub cubic antiprism s{4,3,2} - A related nonuniform polychoron

Alternative names 
 Snub-cuboctahedral dyadic prism (Norman W. Johnson) 
 Sniccup (Jonathan Bowers: for snub-cubic prism) 
 Snub-cuboctahedral hyperprism 
 Snub-cubic hyperprism

External links 
 
 

4-polytopes